Jay Tyler Chapman (born January 1, 1994) is a Canadian professional soccer player who plays for USL Championship club Colorado Springs Switchbacks.

Early career
Chapman spent two years at TFC Academy, before leaving to play at Michigan State University. During his final year, Chapman was named as a First Team All-American, the first Spartan to achieve first team honours since 1970. Chapman was also a 2014 MAC Hermann Trophy semifinalist, and Big Ten Midfielder of the Year. In 2012, he signed with SC Toronto of the Canadian Soccer League, and made his debut on May 11, 2012, in a match against St. Catharines Wolves, and recorded his first goal for the club in a 5–0 victory.

In 2013, Chapman made 14 appearances and scored three goals for K-W United in the PDL.

Professional career 
Chapman signed with Toronto FC as a homegrown player on January 15, 2015.

Chapman was loaned to Toronto FC's USL club, Toronto FC II, on March 20, 2015.

He made his debut against the Charleston Battery on March 21. He scored his first goal for Toronto FC II against Whitecaps FC 2 on April 19. Chapman made his Toronto FC debut a few weeks later in the 2015 Canadian Championship against the Montreal Impact on May 6 as a substitute.

On July 12, 2016, Chapman and teammate Jordan Hamilton were named to the 2016 Chipotle MLS Homegrown team as part of Major League Soccer's 2016 All Star Game festivities.

On November 13, 2019, Chapman was traded to Inter Miami in exchange for $100,000 in General Allocation Money. Following the 2021 season, Chapman's contract option was declined by Miami.

In January 2022, Scottish Premiership club Dundee announced they had signed Chapman to a deal, subject to international clearance and a work permit. Chapman would make his debut as a substitute in the Dundee derby on February 1. Chapman would play once more for Dundee in a league game against Motherwell as he would struggle to break into the first team. Chapman returned to North America at the end of the season, and despite being contracted for another year he did not return to Scotland, apparently due to "paperwork issues". Chapman would officially leave Dundee by mutual consent in October.

On 14 January 2023, Chapman signed for USL Championship club Colorado Springs Switchbacks.

International career 

Chapman represented Canada at the U-17 level at the 2011 CONCACAF U-17 Championship, and the 2011 FIFA U-17 World Cup.

Chapman made his debut for the senior team on January 22, 2017, against Bermuda and scored on his first appearance in a 4–2 victory.

Career statistics

Club

International

International statistics

International goals 

Scores and results list Canada's goal tally first.

Honours
Michigan State Spartans
 Big Ten Men's Soccer Tournament: 2012

Toronto
 MLS Cup: 2017
 Supporters' Shield: 2017
 Canadian Championship: 2016, 2017, 2018

Individual
 NCAA Division I men's soccer First-Team All-American: 2014
 Big Ten Midfielder of the Year: 2014

References

External links 

1994 births
Living people
Canadian soccer players
Canada men's international soccer players
Canada men's youth international soccer players
Canadian expatriate soccer players
Michigan State Spartans men's soccer players
K-W United FC players
Toronto FC players
Toronto FC II players
Association football midfielders
Expatriate soccer players in the United States
USL League Two players
Major League Soccer players
Canadian people of English descent
SC Toronto players
Canadian Soccer League (1998–present) players
All-American men's college soccer players
Inter Miami CF players
Homegrown Players (MLS)
Soccer players from Brampton
Expatriate footballers in Scotland
Scottish Professional Football League players
Dundee F.C. players
Canadian expatriate sportspeople in the United States
Canadian expatriate sportspeople in Scotland
USL Championship players
Colorado Springs Switchbacks FC players